Dick Campbell (born uly 17, 1935) is a former American football linebacker who played professionally in the National Football League (NFL). He was drafted by the Pittsburgh Steelers in the tenth round of the 1958 NFL Draft and played three seasons with the team.

References

1935 births
Living people
American football linebackers
Marquette Golden Avalanche football players
Pittsburgh Steelers players
Sportspeople from Green Bay, Wisconsin
Players of American football from Wisconsin